Bernard Daniel Katz, born Bernard Daniel Clifford, (10 August 1968 – 31 August 2017) was the long-serving manager of the Groucho Club. Katz was the author of Soho Society in 2008. He was nicknamed "The Prince of Soho" by Stephen Fry. He was the son of the notorious south London gangster Brian "Little Legs" Clifford.

See also
 Muriel Belcher

References

External links

Soho, London
People from Kennington
Nightclub managers
1968 births
2017 deaths
20th-century British businesspeople